The Yuanba gas field is a natural gas field located in Sichuan. It was discovered in 2011 and developed by and Sinopec. It will begin production in 2015 and will produce natural gas and condensates. The total proven reserves of the Yuanba gas field are around 5.6 trillion cubic feet (160 km³), and production is slated to be around 325.5 million cubic feet/day (9.3×105m³).

References

Natural gas fields in China